The Comedy Awards was an annual award ceremony run by the American television network Comedy Central, honoring the best of comedy. It was held twice, in 2011 and 2012. The 2011 ceremony took place on March 26 and aired on April 10 on CMT, Comedy Central, Logo TV, Nick at Nite, Spike, TV Land and VH1. It debuted on The Comedy Channel in Australia on May 22, 2011.

The Comedy Awards represented Comedy Central's second attempt at creating an annual awards show, after the Commie Awards, which ran once in 2003. Comedy Central had also hosted the American Comedy Awards in 2001, which was those awards' last successive year after having been founded in 1989.

Categories
The award categories consist of:

Film
Comedy Film
Animated Comedy Film
Comedy Actor - Film
Comedy Actress - Film
Comedy Screenplay
Comedy Director - Film

Television
Comedy Series
Comedy Actor - Television
Comedy Actress - Television
Late Night Comedy Series
Sketch Comedy/Alternative Comedy Series
Stand-Up Special
Animated Comedy Series
Comedy Writing - Television
Comedy Directing - Television

Viewers Choice
Breakthrough Performer
Best Viral Original

Special Awards
Johnny Carson Award for Comedic Excellence
Comedy Icon Award

2011 Comedy Awards
Nominations were announced on February 15, 2011. The awards aired on April 10 on Comedy Central and other Viacom-owned networks including Spike, CMT, VH1, LOGO and TV Land. The Comedy Award statuette was created by New York firm Society Awards.

Film

Comedy Icon Award
The inaugural Comedy Icon Award was presented to Eddie Murphy by Tracy Morgan.

Television

Johnny Carson Comedy Award
The inaugural Johnny Carson Comedy Award was presented to David Letterman by Bill Murray.

2012 Comedy Awards
The nominees were announced on March 6, 2012.

Film

Television

Johnny Carson Comedy Award
The Johnny Carson Comedy Award was presented to Don Rickles by Robert De Niro and Jon Stewart.

Other awards

Comedy Icon Award
The Stand-Up Icon Award was presented to Robin Williams by Patton Oswalt.

Club Comic
 Ted Alexandro
 Hannibal Buress
 Pete Holmes
 Anthony Jeselnik
 Moshe Kasher
 John Mulaney
 Kumail Nanjiani
 Chelsea Peretti
 Amy Schumer
 Rory Scovel

Stand-Up Tour
Dave Attell
Lewis Black
Louis C.K.
Kevin Hart
Jerry Seinfeld

Viewer's Choice
 Zooey Deschanel
 Josh Gad
Donald Glover
 Melissa McCarthy
 Jason Sudeikis

Best Viral Original
"Songify This - Winning - A Song by Charlie Sheen"

References

External links
 The Comedy Awards - Official Website

Comedy Central
American comedy and humor awards
Awards established in 2011
2010s in comedy